Beauvale, or Beauvale Newthorpe, is a village in Nottinghamshire, England. It is located 1 mile to the east of Eastwood. It is in Greasley parish. Beauvale Priory is the remains of a Carthusian monastery, or Charterhouse, founded in 1343 by Nicholas de Cantilupe. The extant remains include part of the church and a three-storey tower house, which may have been the Prior's lodging.

Gallery

References

External links

Villages in Nottinghamshire
Places in the Borough of Broxtowe